This article contains notable folk singers that are based in Pakistan.
Following are the most popular Pakistani folk singers of all times.

Wajid ali Baghdadi

For more folk singers by their letter specifications you can find it below.

A
 Alam Lohar
 Abida Parveen
 Arif Lohar
 Attaullah Khan Esakhelvi
 Allan Fakir

F
Farida Khanum

G
Ghulam Ali

I
 Iqbal Bahu

M
Mai Bhaghi

P
 Pathanay Khan

R
 Rahim Shah
 Reshma

S
 Saieen Zahoor
 Shaukat Ali
 Sanam Marvi

T
Tufail Niazi

W
Wajid Ali Baghdadi

See also 
 Music of Pakistan
 Music of South Asia
 Culture of Pakistan
 List of Pakistanis

External links 
 Punjabi Folk Music
 Information about Indo-Pakistan music

Folk singers
Folk singers